Patra may refer to:

 Patra (singer) (born 1972), female reggae artist
 Patra Sherani, town and union council of Dera Bugti District in Balochistan, Pakistan
 Patra TV, television station in Patras, Greece
 Patras, port city in western Greece 
 Pātra, the Sanskrit name for Ōryōki, a nested set of bowls and eating utensils used by Buddhist monks
 Patra, an ethnic group in Bangladesh and India
 Patra, Sahibganj, a census town in Jharkhand, India
 Colocasia esculenta, a tropical plant

See also
 Patra ni machhi, Parsi dish made from steamed fish topped with chutney and wrapped in a banana leaf
 Patrode, vegetarian dish from Gujarat, India made from colocasia leave stuffed with rice flour
 Prem Patra, 1962 Indian Bollywood film produced and directed by Bimal Roy
 Strir Patra, 1972 Bengali film, directed by Purnendu Patri